Denis Arthur Smalley (born 1946 in Nelson, New Zealand) is a composer of electroacoustic music, with a special interest in acousmatic music.

Biography
Denis Smalley studied at the University of Canterbury and Victoria University in his native New Zealand, and later at the Paris Conservatoire with Olivier Messiaen, with the Groupe de Recherches Musicales (GRM), and at the University of York.

He initially composed onto tape, but as early as the 1980s realised his works using computer software. His composition Pentes (1974) is regarded as one of the classics of electroacoustic music. Source sounds for his works may come from the environment—and are often the starting point for his pieces—but he may also develop highly sophisticated timbres from scratch using computer software. He describes his approach as "spectromorphological", featuring the development of sounds in time.

A lecturer at the University of East Anglia, England, from 1976 to 1994, he was professor of music at City University, London from 1994 until his retirement.

His music has been performed around the world and most of his major works appear on commercially released CDs.

Recordings

 Impacts intérieurs (empreintes DIGITALes, IMED 0409, 2004)
 Sources/scènes (empreintes DIGITALes, IMED 0054, 2000)
 Névé (Effects Input, EI 03, 1994)
 Tides (Ode Records (New Zealand), MANU 1433, 1993)
 Impacts intérieurs (empreintes DIGITALes, IMED 9209, 1992)

List of works

 Base Metals (2000)
 Berne Mobiles (1980), installation
 Clarinet Threads (1985), clarinet, and tape, received a Golden Nica (Ars Electronica, Linz, Austria) in 1988
 Darkness After Time's Colours (1976), received a Euphonie d'Or (Bourges competition) in 1992
 Empty Vessels (1997)
 Gradual (1974), amplified clarinets, and tape
 Névé (1994)
 Ouroboros (1975)
 O Vos Omnes (1986), eight-part choir, and tape
 Pentes (1974)
 Piano Nets (1990–91), piano, and tape
 Pneuma (1976, 81), amplified voices, and percussion
 The Pulses of Time (1979)
 Resounding (2004), 6-track tape
 Ringing Down the Sun (2002), 6-track tape
 Spectral Lands (2011) for electroacoustic sounds in six channels
 Tides (1984)
 Valley Flow (1991–92)
 Vortex (1982)
 Wind Chimes (1987)

References

Further reading 
 Paland, Ralph. 2009. "Denis Smalley". Komponisten der Gegenwart (KDG). 40. Nachlieferung (11/2009), Munich 2009, pages 1–2. .

External links
 His personal site

1946 births
Living people
New Zealand classical composers
Male classical composers
20th-century classical composers
21st-century classical composers
New Zealand electronic musicians
Electroacoustic music composers
Academics of City, University of London
Academics of the University of East Anglia
Alumni of the University of York
20th-century male musicians
21st-century male musicians